An activity tracker, also known as a fitness tracker, is a device or application for monitoring and tracking fitness-related metrics such as distance walked or run, calorie consumption, and in some cases heartbeat. It is a type of wearable computer. The term is now primarily used for smartwatches that are synced, in many cases wirelessly, to a computer or smartphone for long-term data tracking. There are also independent mobile and Facebook apps. Some evidence has found that the use of these type of devices results in less weight loss rather than more. Sleep tracker devices have a tendency to underdetect wakefulness.

History
The term "activity trackers" now primarily refers to wearable devices that monitor and record a person's fitness activity. The concept grew out of written logs that led to spreadsheet-style computer logs in which entries were made manually, such as that provided in the US by the President's Council on Physical Fitness and Sports as part of The President's Challenge. Improvements in technology in the late 20th and early 21st century allow automating the monitoring and recording of fitness activities and integrating them into more easily worn equipment.  Early examples include wristwatch-sized bicycle computers that monitored speed, duration, distance, etc., available at least by the early 1990s.  Wearable heart rate monitors for athletes were available in 1981.  Wearable fitness tracking devices, including wireless heart rate monitoring that integrated with commercial-grade fitness equipment found in gyms, were available in consumer-grade electronics by at least the early 2000s.

Electronic activity trackers are fundamentally upgraded versions of pedometers; in addition to counting steps, they use accelerometers and altimeters to calculate mileage, graph overall physical activity, calculate calorie expenditure, and in some cases also monitor and graph heart rate and quality of sleep. Some also include a silent alarm. Some newer models approach the US definition of a Class II medical monitor, and some manufacturers hope to eventually make them capable of alerting to a medical problem, although FDA approval would be required. Early versions such as the original Fitbit (2009), were worn clipped to the waist; formats have since diversified to include wristbands and armbands (smart bands) and smaller devices that can be clipped wherever preferred. Apple and Nike together developed the Nike+iPod, a sensor-equipped shoe that worked with an iPod Nano.

In addition, logging apps exist for smartphones and Facebook; the Nike+ system now works without the shoe sensor, through the GPS unit in the phone. The  Apple Watch and some other smart watches offer fitness tracker functions. In the US, BodyMedia has developed a disposable activity tracker to be worn for a week, which is aimed at medical and insurance providers and employers seeking to measure employees' fitness, and Jawbone's UP for Groups aggregates and anonymizes data from the company's wearable activity trackers and apps for employers. Other activity trackers are intended to monitor vital signs in the elderly, epileptics, and people with sleep disorders and alert a caregiver to a problem.

Earbuds and headphones are a better location for measuring some data, including core body temperature; Valencell has developed sensor technology for new activity trackers that take their readings at the ear rather than the wrist, arm, or waist. Numerous companies have also released devices in the form of a ring that leverage the capillaries in the finger.

There are collar-mounted activity trackers for dogs.

Much of the appeal of activity trackers that makes them effective tools in increasing personal fitness comes from their making it into a game, and from the social dimension of sharing via social media and resulting rivalry. The device can serve as a means of identification with a community, which extends to broader participation.

The standard activity-tracking smartphone or web apps present data in statistical form meant to be viewed after the activity has ended. However, research suggests that if we want a richer understanding of the data, we need intelligent computing to be included in the systems that run the apps.

Some users and reviewers remain ambivalent towards the technology, making the point that in such a "mirror" displaying one's identity, misrepresentations are problematic. There is also research problematizing tracking devices in relation to how we inhabit, experience and imagine our bodies and lives. All forms of lifelogging also carry privacy implications. Social networks associated with activity trackers have led to breaches of privacy such as involuntary publication of sexual activity, and the potential for advertisers and health insurers to access private health data through the devices is a concern.
In 2016, there were several advances made in regard to fitness tracking geared toward kids with a variety of options from organizations such as UNICEF and Garmin.

Wearable sensors 
Wearable sensors have been widely used in medical sciences, sports and security. Wearable sensors can detect abnormal and unforeseen situations, and monitor physiological parameters and symptoms through these trackers.  This technology has transformed healthcare by allowing continuous monitoring of patients without hospitalization.  Medical monitoring of patients’ body temperature, heart rate, heart rate variability, brain activity, muscle motion and other critical data can be delivered through these trackers.  Moreover, in sports training there is an increasing demand for wearable sensors.  For example, measurement of sweat rate was possible only in laboratory based systems a few years ago, but is now possible using wearable sensors. Heart rate variability (HRV) has potential in determining the quality of an exercise regimen. Additionally, HRV is recommended among the athletic community as a warning sign for over-training. In these ways, HRV can be used to optimize performance.

Performance 
Activity trackers are available both with and without display.

Certain movements of the user, such as working in the household, cycling, swimming, dancing or rowing can distort the results obtained from activity trackers. In a test conducted by Stiftung Warentest, for example, no product determined the distance of a bike ride, even approximately. Furthermore, the determined values for the human energy transformation were erroneous. With the heart rate large deviations have been observed at wristlet trackers, and it is recommended for this purpose to use appropriate chest straps.

Wristbands can be uncomfortable to wear and inadvertently be lost. For some products genotoxic substances were detected.

The connection of activity trackers with social networks can lead to violation of privacy, such as involuntary publication of sexual activity. The apps of some activity trackers not only transmit personal data, but also private address lists to servers on the Internet without notifying or asking the user.  Even when anonymized, the mere presence of geolocation data may be a national security risk. However, the results of a study among semi-professional (half-) marathon participants suggests that these users are open towards sharing tracked activity data on a voluntary basis with: friends (51.7%), family members (43.4%), or a physician (32.3%).

Medical uses
In those who are overweight or obese some evidence has found that the use of these type of devices results in less weight loss rather than more after 18 months of use. However, it has been noted that the activity tracker used in this study is a now-discontinued model that is worn on the upper arm, which might be uncomfortable, and wear times of the tracker were low. One review of six studies found that there was little evidence that activity trackers improve health outcomes. Of five studies that looked at weight loss, one found benefit, one found harm, and three found no effect. Another systematic review covering 35 studies and 7454 participants, published at the British Journal of Sports Medicine, found that activity trackers increased people's physical activity by an average of 1850 steps/day.

According to another study comparing 8-week interventions and four month follow-up of physical activity monitors, a guided weight loss program, and both together, activity monitoring and the weight loss program are associated with similar improvements and both combined are associated with more improvements than either alone.

It is unclear whether activity changes occur in children and adolescents.

See also

 Sleep tracking
 Actigraphy
 eHealth
 Internet of Things
 Quantified self, movement to record, analyze, and improve one's daily life
 Smartwatch
 Wearable computer

References

Further reading
 Robert Scoble, Shel Israel. Age of Context: Mobile, Sensors, Data and the Future of Privacy. Patrick Brewster, 2014. .

 
Internet of things
Smart bands
Sports nutrition
Wearable computers